Marcus John Hudson Fysh (born 8 November 1970) is a British politician and former investment manager who became the Member of Parliament (MP) for Yeovil in 2015. A member of the Conservative Party, he served as Parliamentary Under-Secretary of State for Exports from September 2022 until 27 October 2022. Fysh was a supporter of Leave Means Leave, a pro-Brexit lobby group; he campaigned to leave the European Union (EU) in the 2016 referendum. He is a regular contributor to The Telegraph as well as writing a weekly column in the Western Gazette.

Early life and career
Fysh was born on 8 November 1970 in Australia. His family moved to the UK when he was three. He was educated at Winchester College, a boarding independent school for boys in Winchester, Hampshire. He went on to study literature at Corpus Christi College, Oxford. Prior to his election he ran companies in the agriculture and healthcare sectors, after working for Mercury Asset Management specialising in investment in businesses in the Asia Pacific region.

Fysh was elected for the Conservative Party as a district councillor for South Somerset in 2011, representing Yeovil South ward, which he served on for one four-year term. In 2013, he was elected to represent the Coker ward of Somerset County Council; following his election as an MP he did not stand at the following local election in 2017.

Parliamentary career
Marcus Fysh was elected as Member of Parliament for the Yeovil constituency on 7 May 2015. He was re-elected with an increased majority at the 2017 general election and then increased his majority further in 2019.

Before becoming a Minister, Fysh chaired the All Party Parliamentary Group on Education. He has been a member of All-party parliamentary groups for the Armed Forces, for Housing, for Education, for Social Care, for County Councils, and for Women Against State Pension Inequality.

In the House of Commons he sat on the European Scrutiny Committee and has been a member of the International Trade Select Committee and the Public Administration and Public Affairs Committee.

In March 2019, Fysh was one of 21 MPs who voted against LGBT inclusive sex and relationship education in English schools, citing concerns about the teaching of gender fluidity confusing very young children.

In June 2020, the Parliamentary Commissioner for Standards found that Fysh should have registered his unremunerated company directorships as interests. The Committee noted: "We do not believe that Mr Fysh has acted in bad faith. He exercised his right as a Member of the House to express disagreement with the Commissioner's interpretation of the rules and bring the matter before the Committee." It added that he should "make an apology on the floor of the House for both the non-registrations and non-declarations by means of a personal statement." Fysh was also told to apologise to the commissioner and registrar in writing. Fysh then issued the two apologies.

In October 2021 Fysh officially opened the construction site for upgrades to the A303, having campaigned on the issue for years.

Fysh has objected to COVID-19 vaccine passports in the UK. In December 2021, he said on BBC Radio 5 Live that the passes would be "segregating society based on an unacceptable thing", adding: "We are not a 'papers please' society. This is not Nazi Germany."

Personal life
Fysh lives in London and at Naish Priory in the village of East Coker. In 2011, Fysh opposed plans by the local council to build additional houses in the area.

References

External links
Official website

1970 births
Conservative Party (UK) councillors
Conservative Party (UK) MPs for English constituencies
Councillors in Somerset
Living people
People educated at Winchester College
UK MPs 2015–2017
UK MPs 2017–2019
UK MPs 2019–present
Alumni of Corpus Christi College, Oxford